Sevenoaks is a town in Kent, England.

Sevenoaks may also refer to

Sevenoaks District, a local government district in Kent, England
Sevenoaks School, a public school
Sevenoaks (UK Parliament constituency)
Seven Oaks Community, a neighborhood in Wesley Chapel, Florida